Sagauli is a village in Hilauli block of Unnao district, Uttar Pradesh, India. As of 2011, its population is 2,048, in 380 households, and it has 3 primary schools and no healthcare facilities.

The 1961 census recorded Sagauli as comprising 2 hamlets, with a total population of 858 (496 male and 362 female), in 160 households and 140 physical houses. The area of the village was given as 656 acres. It had a post office then.

References

Villages in Unnao district